The 1933–34 Kangaroo tour of Great Britain was the fifth Kangaroo tour, and took the Australia national rugby league team around the north of England, to London and Paris. The tour also featured the 11th Ashes series which comprised three Test matches and was the first to be won by Great Britain in a clean sweep. The squad's outbound journey was marred by tragedy when Sydney University centre Ray Morris contracted meningitis en route and died in hospital. The tour match played at Stade Pershing in Paris on New Year's Day 1934 was the first rugby league international played in France.

Touring squad 

Frank McMillan was named as captain-coach of the touring squad after his Queensland counterpart Herb Steinohrt declared himself unavailable to tour. George Bishop and Ernie Norman were selected but ruled out of the tour before the squad left Sydney. Vic Hey and "Mick" Glasheen took their places.

The journey 
Les Heidke was suffering from leg ulcers before the squad left Sydney and Dan Dempsey was brought in to take his place. The Queenslanders in the squad all contributed £10 to enable Heidke to make the tour as a private citizen and to perhaps recover in time to play. Heidke sailed with the squad from Sydney on the SS Manduna bound for Melbourne where they boarded the SS Jervis Bay for England. At sea Heidke's condition did not improve and he was put off the ship in Perth and headed home.

Exhibition matches were played in Colombo, Sri Lanka and in Egypt. Sydney University centre Ray Morris contracted an ear infection at sea. In the Mediterranean his condition worsened and he was put off the ship in Malta and hospitalised in Valletta. Two days later he died of meningitis.

Test Venues 
The three Ashes series tests took place at the following venues. Two of the tests were played at Swinton.

1st Test 

The Australian team enjoyed an eleven match winning streak on the tour matches leading into the first Test. For the first sixty-five minutes of the match there was no score in the muddy conditions, then Lions fullback Jim Sullivan proved the difference with two penalty goals.

2nd Test

3rd Test 

In winning the match which was played in thick fog, England became the first team to post a 3–0 clean sweep in an Anglo-Australian Test series.

Matches of the tour

Tour firsts 
 The first Australian side to play a rugby exhibition match in Ceylon and Egypt.
 The first Australian side to play a match under lights.
 The first English side to win the Ashes in a clean sweep.
 The first rugby international to be played in France.
 Dave Brown's tour point-scoring record of 285 points (19 tries and 114 goals) remains unsurpassed.

Published sources 
 Whiticker, Alan & Hudson, Glen (2006) The Encyclopedia of Rugby League Players, Gavin Allen Publishing, Sydney
 Andrews, Malcolm (2006) The ABC of Rugby League Austn Broadcasting Corpn, Sydney

References 

Australia national rugby league team tours
Rugby league tours of Great Britain
Kangaroo tour of Great Britain
Kangaroo tour of Great Britain
Kangaroo tour of Great Britain
Kangaroo tour of Great Britain
Kangaroo tour of Great Britain
Kangaroo tour of Great Britain
Kangaroo tour of Great Britain